Lyès Saïdi (born August 24, 1987 in Sidi Aïch) is an Algerian footballer who last played for Algerian Ligue Professionnelle 1 club MC Oran.

Club career
In the summer of 2009, Saïdi signed a two-year contract with JS Kabylie, joining them on a free transfer from ORB Akbou.

On May 2, 2011, Saïdi started for JS Kabylie in the 2011 Algerian Cup Final against USM El Harrach. JS Kabylie went on to win the game 1-0 with Saïdi playing the entire game. It was his first title with the club.

Honours
 Won the Algerian Cup once with JS Kabylie in 2011
 Won the World Military Cup once with the Algeria military national football team in 2011

References

External links
 
 

1987 births
Living people
People from Sidi-Aïch
Kabyle people
Algerian footballers
Algerian Ligue Professionnelle 1 players
JS Kabylie players
ASO Chlef players
MC Oran players
Association football midfielders
21st-century Algerian people